Winterlingen is a municipality in the Zollernalbkreis district of Baden-Württemberg, Germany.

History
Winterlingen was first documented around 1264 as a possession of the County of Hohenberg. It was purchased by the County of Württemberg around 1387. After 1469, Winterlingen was permanently a possession of Württemberg. Some residential and commercial expansion of Winterlingen took place before World War II, and it slowly expanded after the war starting in the 1950s to the north and southwest. In 1942 Selma Burkard killed in tragedy of the Holocaust.

Geography
Winterlingen is a municipality (Gemeinde) of Zollernalb district of Baden-Württemberg, one of the 16 States of the Federal Republic of Germany. It lies along the south-eastern edge of the district and borders the district of Sigmaringen to the east. A small portion of the area is located in the Baar region to the west. Elevation above sea level in the municipal area ranges from a high of  Normalnull (NN) to a low of  NN.

Coat of arms
The coat of arms for Winterlingen displays two general areas, divided vertically into two halves. The left half has two fields: an upper white and a lower red, and the right half has a yellow half with three stag antlers. These are, respectively, the coats of arms for the County of Hohenberg, impaled with that of Württemberg. This pattern is from a seal that began usage in Winterlingen's town hall in 1930 and replaced an earlier seal, used by the local Schultheiß. This coat of arms was approved by the post-WWII provisional Württemberg-Hohenzollern government on 13 July 1951.

Stolpersteine
The following people have been memorialized with stolpersteine:
 Dr. Emil Burkart (1884–1957), degree in Human Medicin, entomologist about 9.000 specimens in the State Museum of Natural History Stuttgart
 Selma Burkart (1885–1942), Holocaust victim further research create the Sister City Izbica/Winterlingen

References

External links
  (in German)

Web
 Sammlung Hieronymus Edelmann (1853–1921), Hyronimus Edelmann British Museum